Mytilaster is a genus of marine mussels from the warmer waters of the Atlantic Ocean and Mediterranean Basin. The type species is Mytilaster lineatus.

Species
 Mytilaster lineatus (Gmelin, 1791)
 Mytilaster marioni (Locard, 1889)
 Mytilaster minimus (Poli, 1795) — dwarf mussel
 Mytilaster solidus Monterosato, 1884 ex H. Martin ms.
 Mytilaster solisianus'' (d'Orbigny, 1842)

References

 
Bivalve genera